Stefanos Tsitsipas defeated Andrey Rublev in the final, 6–3, 6–3 to win the singles tennis title at the 2021 Monte-Carlo Masters. It was his first ATP Tour Masters 1000 title, making him the first Greek to win a Masters tournament. Rublev was also in contention for his maiden Masters 1000 title.

Fabio Fognini was the defending champion from when the tournament was last held in 2019, but lost to Casper Ruud in the quarterfinals.

Seeds
The top eight seeds received a bye into the second round.

Draw

Finals

Top half

Section 1

Section 2

Bottom half

Section 3

Section 4

Qualifying

Seeds

Qualifiers

Lucky losers

Qualifying draw

First qualifier

Second qualifier

Third qualifier

Fourth qualifier

Fifth qualifier

Sixth qualifier

Seventh qualifier

References

External links
 Main draw
 Qualifying draw

Singles